City Slickers is a 1991 American comedy Western film directed by Ron Underwood and starring Billy Crystal, Daniel Stern, Bruno Kirby and Jack Palance, with supporting roles by Patricia Wettig, Helen Slater and Noble Willingham with Jake Gyllenhaal in his debut.

The film's screenplay was written by Lowell Ganz and Babaloo Mandel, and it was shot in New York City; New Mexico; Durango, Colorado; and Spain. For his performance, Palance won the Academy Award for Best Supporting Actor.

A sequel, entitled The Legend of Curly's Gold, was released in 1994, with the same cast, with the exception of Kirby, who was replaced by Jon Lovitz.

Plot 

In Pamplona, Spain, middle-aged friends Mitch Robbins, Ed Furrilo, and Phil Berquist, participate in the running of the bulls. Back home in New York City, Mitch realizes he and his friends use adventure trips as escapism from their mundane lives. 

Mitch hates his radio advertising sales job. Phil is trapped in a loveless marriage to his wife Arlene while managing his father-in-law's supermarket (who also bullies Phil). Ed is a successful sporting goods salesman who recently married a significantly younger woman but is unwilling to fully settle down.

At Mitch's 39th birthday party, Phil and Ed give Mitch a trip for all three to go on a two-week cattle drive from New Mexico to Colorado. Phil's 20-year-old employee unexpectedly arrives at the party and announces she is pregnant with his baby, causing Arlene to walk out. Mitch's wife, Barbara, insists he go on the cattle drive to soul search for a new purpose in his life. 

In New Mexico, the trio meet ranch owner, Clay Stone, and their fellow cattle drivers: entrepreneurial brothers Barry and Ira Shalowitz, young and attractive Bonnie, and father-son dentists, Ben and Steve Jessup. Mitch confronts ranch hands, Jeff and T.R., when they begin sexually harassing Bonnie. Trail boss Curly intervenes, though he inadvertently humiliates Mitch.

During the drive, Mitch accidentally causes a stampede which destroys the camp. While searching for stray cows, Mitch discovers Curly has a kind nature beneath his gruff exterior. Curly encourages Mitch to discover the "one thing" in his life that is most important to him. Along the way, Mitch helps deliver a calf from a dying cow. Mitch names the calf Norman.

Shortly after, Curly suffers a fatal heart attack, leaving the drive under Jeff and T.R.'s control. The camp cook, Cookie, gets drunk and inadvertently destroys the food supply, breaking his leg in the process. 

After the Jessups leave to take Cookie to a nearby town, Jeff and T.R. become intoxicated. A fight ensues when they threaten to kill Norman and assault Mitch. Phil and Ed intervene, and Phil holds Jeff at gunpoint, which unleashes his pent-up emotions. Soon after, Jeff and T.R. abandon the group. Bonnie and the Shalowitzes continue on to the Colorado ranch, while Ed and Phil remain behind to finish the drive. Mitch also leaves but soon returns to rejoin his friends.

After braving a heavy storm, they drive the herd to Colorado. When Norman nearly drowns as the herd crosses a river, Mitch acts to save him. Both are swept down current, but Phil and Ed rescue them. They safely reach the Colorado ranch. When Stone offers to reimburse everyone's fee, the Jessups prefer going on a future cattle drive. However, Clay reveals he is selling the herd to a meat packing company. Mitch, Phil, and Ed initially believe they saved the cattle for nothing, but decide to use their experience to help re-evaluate their lives.

The men return to New York City. Mitch, a happier man, reunites with Barbara and their two children; he has also brought Norman home as a pet. Phil, having learned his employee is not pregnant after all, begins a relationship with Bonnie. Ed intends to start a family with his wife. Mitch is ready to restart his life with a new vision.

Cast

Production
The film's plot, which consists of inexperienced cowboys battling villains as they press on with their cattle drive after the death of their leader, was conceived to be similar to John Wayne's The Cowboys, although that was a Western drama as opposed to a comedy.

In his 2013 memoir, Still Foolin' Em, Billy Crystal writes of how the casting of the film came about. "Palance," he says, "was the first choice from the beginning, but had a commitment to make another film." He wrote that he contacted Charles Bronson about the part, only to be rudely rebuffed because the character dies. Palance got out of his other obligation to join the cast. Rick Moranis, originally cast as Phil, had to leave the production due to his wife's illness. Daniel Stern was a late replacement in the role. The film was also the debut of actor Jake Gyllenhaal.

Reception

Critical response
On Rotten Tomatoes, City Slickers received a "Certified Fresh" 88% rating based on 43 reviews. The site's critical consensus reads, "With a supremely talented cast and just enough midlife drama to add weight to its wildly silly overtones, City Slickers uses universal themes to earn big laughs." On Metacritic the film has a weighted average score of 70 out of 100, based on reviews from 25 critics. Audiences surveyed by CinemaScore gave the film an average grade of "A" on a scale of A+ to F.

Roger Ebert of the Chicago Sun-Times gave the film 3 1/2 stars out of 4 and wrote: "City Slickers comes packaged as one kind of movie – a slapstick comedy about white-collar guys on a dude ranch – and it delivers on that level while surprising me by being much more ambitious, and successful, than I expected. This is the proverbial comedy with the heart of truth, the tear in the eye along with the belly laugh. It's funny, and it adds up to something."

Awards and honors

Jack Palance, for his role as Curly, won the 1992 Academy Award for Best Supporting Actor, which was the only Oscar nomination the film received. His acceptance speech for the award is best remembered for his demonstration of one-armed push-ups, which he claimed convinced studio insurance agents that he was healthy enough to work on the film. 
Billy Crystal was the Academy Awards host, and used the humorous incident for several jokes throughout the evening. Later that night, Palance placed the Oscar on Crystal's shoulder and said, "Billy Crystal ... who thought it would be you?" Crystal added in his book, "We had a glass of champagne together, and I could only imagine what Charles Bronson was thinking as he went to sleep that night." The next year's Oscars opened with Palance appearing to drag in a giant Academy Award, with Crystal (again the host) riding on the opposite end.

The film is also recognized by American Film Institute in these lists:
 2000: AFI's 100 Years...100 Laughs – #86
 2005: AFI's 100 Years...100 Movie Quotes:
 Mitch Robbins: "Hi, Curly, kill anyone today?"
 Curly: "Day ain't over yet."
 – Nominated
 2005: AFI's 100 Years of Film Scores – Nominated

The film is ranked No. 73 on Bravo's "100 Funniest Movies".

In popular culture
 The Billy Crystal episode of Muppets Tonight featured a parody entitled "City Schtickers," with Kermit the Frog and Fozzie Bear in Kirby and Stern's roles.
 Funny or Die produced a mash-up short that combined the film with the 2016 HBO series Westworld that featured Crystal and Stern.
 In American Dad season 8, episode 1, "Love, AD Style", Roger Smith implies that one of his disguises is Lowell Ganz when he states, "I co-wrote City Slickers with Babaloo Mandel but I can't do this" in regard to poorly running his bar.

References

External links

 
 
 

1990s English-language films
1990s American films
1991 films
1990s buddy comedy films
1990s Western (genre) comedy films
American Western (genre) comedy films
American buddy comedy films
Castle Rock Entertainment films
Columbia Pictures films
Films directed by Ron Underwood
Films featuring a Best Supporting Actor Academy Award-winning performance
Films featuring a Best Supporting Actor Golden Globe winning performance
Films scored by Marc Shaiman
Films set in Colorado
Films set in New Mexico
Films set in New York City
Films set in Spain
Films shot in New Mexico
Films with screenplays by Babaloo Mandel
Films with screenplays by Lowell Ganz
Midlife crisis films
Neo-Western films